Geoff Cutmore (born 23 December 1966) is an English financial journalist for CNBC Europe in London. He presents CNBC Europe's breakfast news programme Squawk Box Europe, and has done so since 1999. He's also an occasional relief presenter of Asia Squawk Box on CNBC Asia.

Cutmore has been with CNBC for more than twenty years and prior to presenting Squawk Box Europe he worked for CNBC Asia and was based in Hong Kong.

References

External links
CNBC profile

Living people
British television journalists
1966 births